George Wellesley Hamilton (1846–1915) was an Ontario political figure. He represented Prescott in the Legislative Assembly of Ontario as a Conservative member from 1871 to 1874.

He was born in Hawkesbury in Canada West in 1846, the grandson of George Hamilton. He studied at Bishop's College in Lennoxville, Trinity College in Toronto and Oriel College at Oxford. He served as a lieutenant in the local militia.

External links 

The Canadian parliamentary companion and annual register, 1872, HJ Morgan

1846 births
1915 deaths
Alumni of Oriel College, Oxford
People from Hawkesbury, Ontario
Progressive Conservative Party of Ontario MPPs
Trinity College (Canada) alumni
University of Toronto alumni